The Town of Midland was a local government area in the eastern suburbs of Perth, Western Australia, centred on the suburb of Midland.

History
It was established as the Municipality of Helena Vale on 8 November 1895, when it was proclaimed as the local government authority for the rapidly growing town of Helena Vale. The name "Helena Vale" was chosen because of its closeness to the Helena River.

The first meeting of the newly elected Municipality of Helena Vale was held at the goods shed of the Midland Railway Company on 18 December 1895. Edwin Halpin was sworn in as the first mayor, along with councillors Alfred Eggleston, Thomas Norman, William Smiley, Alexander Watt, Francis Honey and William Brown.

On 12 April 1901, it was renamed the Municipality of Midland Junction after the Midland Junction railway station that had opened in 1894. On 1 July 1961, it was restyled the Town of Midland following the enactment of the Local Government Act 1960.

On 1 April 1970, the Council was forced by the State Government to merge with the Shire of Swan-Guildford to form a new council that would operate effectively and economically for the area, the Shire (later City) of Swan. It is now a major suburb within the City of Swan.

Population

Mayors

See also 
 Midland Railway Workshops

References

Midland
Midland, Western Australia
City of Swan